American rule may refer to:
American rule (successive assignments), rule for successive assignments of rights
American rule (attorney's fees), controlling assessment of attorneys' fees arising out of litigation
American rule (property), stating that there is no implied duty upon the lessor as against wrongdoers to lessee's right of possession

See also
English rule (disambiguation)